Kurt Schier (born 27 February 1929) is a German philologist who specializes in Germanic studies.

Biography
Kurt schier was born in the village of Ober-Maxdorf, near modern-day Jablonec nad Nisou, Czech Republic. From 1949, Schier studied German and Nordic languages and literature, English studies, ethnology and history at the Ludwig Maximilian University of Munich, receiving his Ph.D. in 1955 under the supervision of Friedrich von der Leyen. He habilitated in Nordic philology and Germanic Antiquity at Munich in 1971 with a thesis on Norse mythology. From 1975 until his retirement in 1995, Schier was Chair of Nordic Philology and Head of the Department for Germanic Antiquity at the Ludwig Maximilian University of Munich.

See also
 Heinrich Beck (philologist)
 Otto Höfler

Selected works
 zusammen mit Hugo Kuhn (Hrsg.): Märchen, Mythos, Dichtung. Festschrift zum 90. Geburtstag Friedrich von der Leyens am 19. August 1963. Beck, München 1963.
 Sagaliteratur, Metzler, Stuttgart 1970 (Sammlung Metzler, Abt. D, Band 78).
 Die Saga von Egil (= Saga. Bd. 1). Aus dem Altisländischen herausgegeben und übersetzt von Kurt Schier. Diederichs, Düsseldorf u. a. 1978, .
 Nordlichter. Ausgewählte Schriften 1960–1992, Diederichs, München 1994,  (mit Bibliographie, S. 326–333).
 Egils Saga. Die Saga von Egil Skalla-Grimsson. Herausgegeben und aus dem Altisländischen übersetzt von Kurt Schier. Diederichs, München 1996, .

Sources
 Wilhelm Heizmann (Hrsg.): Analecta septentrionalia. Beiträge zur nordgermanischen Kultur- und Literaturgeschichte [gewidmet Kurt Schier zu seinem 80. Geburtstag], de Gruyter, Berlin 2009 (Ergänzungsbände zum Reallexikon der germanischen Altertumskunde, Band 65), .

1929 births
German male non-fiction writers
German philologists
Germanic studies scholars
Living people
Old Norse studies scholars
Sudeten German people
Ludwig Maximilian University of Munich alumni
Academic staff of the Ludwig Maximilian University of Munich
Writers on Germanic paganism